Ben Gissing is a New Zealand former professional rugby union player. His position was second row. Gissing retired from professional rugby in 2009, taking over at Skerries RFC as player-coach, having previously spent four years at Leinster Rugby. While playing at Edinburgh Rugby he also coached local amateur club Stewart's Melville, helping them to secure promotion to the Scottish Premiership in 2008/09 season.

References

Leinster Rugby players
1975 births
Living people
Rugby union players from Auckland